Kaarle Väinö Voionmaa (to 1906 Wallin) (12 February 1869 in  Jyväskylä – 24 May 1947 in Helsinki) was a Finnish professor, diplomat, member of the parliament of Finland, senator, minister and chancellor. He also was one of the most influential politicians during the early times of independent Republic of Finland.  He was a Social Democrat.

As an academic, Voionmaa contributed to introduce economic and geographic perspectives into Finnish history writings. He has studied the medieval times and the rise of the modern urban industrial society. He was also one of the founders of the School of Social Sciences in 1930 that eventually became the University of Tampere.

Cabinet positions 
Voionmaa was one of the senators in the Tokoi senate in 1917 before the declaration of independence. Later he served as the Minister of Foreign Affairs in the cabinet of Väinö Tanner 1926–1927. He was also the Minister of Trade and Industry in the Cajander 3rd cabinet 1937–1939, and also briefly the Minister of Foreign Affairs in 1938. Voionmaa's experience in foreign affairs grew while he was a member of the Finnish delegation to the League of Nations.

Voionmaa's compositions 
Voionmaa, Väinö, Yhteiskunta ja alkoholikysymys. Raittiusjärjestöjen yhteistoimikunta, 1944.
Voionmaa, Väinö, Tampereen historia. 1932.
Voionmaa, Väinö, Yhteiskunnallinen alkoholikysymys. WSOY 1925.
Voionmaa, Väinö, Suomen talousmaantieto. WSOY 1922.
Voionmaa, Väinö, Valtioelämän perusteet. Edistysseurojen kustannusosakeyhtiö, 1918.
Voionmaa, Väinö, Suur-Suomen luonnolliset rajat, 1918

References

Halila, Aimo (1969), Väinö Voionmaa, Helsinki

External links

1869 births
1947 deaths
People from Jyväskylä
People from Vaasa Province (Grand Duchy of Finland)
Social Democratic Party of Finland politicians
Finnish senators
Ministers for Foreign Affairs of Finland
Ministers of Trade and Industry of Finland
Members of the Parliament of Finland (1919–22)
Members of the Parliament of Finland (1922–24)
Members of the Parliament of Finland (1924–27)
Members of the Parliament of Finland (1927–29)
Members of the Parliament of Finland (1929–30)
Members of the Parliament of Finland (1930–33)
Members of the Parliament of Finland (1933–36)
Members of the Parliament of Finland (1936–39)
Members of the Parliament of Finland (1939–45)
Members of the Parliament of Finland (1945–48)
20th-century Finnish historians
University of Helsinki alumni
Academic staff of the University of Helsinki